Gompholobium scabrum is a species of flowering plant in the pea family Fabaceae and is endemic to the south-west of Western Australia. It is an erect to spreading shrub with linear leaves and pink or purple flowers with some darker markings.

Description
Flowering occurs from August to November and the fruit is a cylindrical pod.

Taxonomy
Gompholobium scabrum was first formally described in 1808 by James Edward Smith in the Transactions of the Linnean Society of London. The specific epithet (scabrum) means "scabrous", referring to the stems.

Distribution and habitat
This species of pea grows on undulating plains in the Avon Wheatbelt, Esperance Plains, Jarrah Forest, Mallee, Swan Coastal Plain and Warren biogeographic regions of south-western Western Australia.

Conservation status
Gompholobium scabrum is classified as "not threatened" by the Government of Western Australia Department of Biodiversity, Conservation and Attractions.

References

Mirbelioids
scabrum
Fabales of Australia
Flora of Western Australia
Plants described in 1808